Raphitoma perplexa is an extinct species of sea snail, a marine gastropod mollusc in the family Raphitomidae.

Description

Distribution
Fossils of this extinct marine species were found in Eocene strata in France.

References

 Cossmann (M.), 1919 Supplément aux mollusques éocèniques de la Loire-Inférieure. Bulletin de la Société des Sciences Naturelles de l'Ouest de la France, sér. 3, t. 5, p. 53-141

External links
 

perplexa
Gastropods described in 1865